Zygnematophyceae (or Conjugatophyceae) is a class of green algae in the paraphylum streptophyte algae, also referred to as Charophyta, consisting of more than 4000 described species. It contains five orders: the Spirogloeales, the Serritaeniales, the Zygnematales, the Spirogyrales, and the Desmidiales. The Zygnematophyceae are the sister clade of the land plants. The body plan of Zygnematophyceae is simple, and appear to have gone through a secondary loss of morphological complexity. The most basal members are unicellular, but filamentous species have evolved at least five times. They contain genes involved in protection from desiccation that appear to have been derived by horizontal gene transfer from bacteria; the genes are found in plants, Zygnematophyceae, bacteria, but no other organisms. The genes may have helped to enable plants to make the transition to life on land.

Sexual reproduction in the Zygnematophyceae takes place through a process called conjugation. Here cells or filaments of opposite gender line up, and tubes form between corresponding cells. The male cells then become amoeboid and crawl across the female, or sometimes both cells crawl into the connecting tube. The cells then meet and fuse to form a zygote, which later undergoes meiosis to produce new cells or filaments. As in land plants, only the female passes its chloroplasts on to the offspring.

Taxonomy
Class Zygnematophyceae
 Subclass Spirogloeophycidae Melkonian, Gontcharov & Marin 2019
 Order Spirogloeales Melkonian, Gontcharov & Marin 2019
 Family Spirogloeaceae Melkonian, Gontcharov & Marin 2019
 Subclass Zygnematophycidae Melkonian, Gontcharov & Marin 2019
 Family Spirogyraceae Palla 1894
 Order Zygnematales Borge & Pascher 1931
 Family Zygnemataceae (Meneghini) Kützing 1843
 Family Mesotaeniaceae Oltmans 1904 (paraphyletic)
 Order Desmidiales Krieger 1933
 Family Gonatozygaceae Fritsch 1927
 Family Closteriaceae Bessey 1907 ex Pritchard 1852
 Family Peniaceae Haeckel 1894
 Family Desmidiaceae Kiitzing 1833b ex Ralfs 1845

Phylogeny
A phylogeny of the families of Zygnematophyceae is presented below:

Habitat
Members of the Zygnematophyceae are common in nearly all freshwater habitats, particularly filamentous genera such as Spirogyra and Mougeotia. Some Spirogyra species can tolerate disturbed habitats. On the other hand, desmids (the Desmidiales) often prefer bogs, peatlands, and lakes.

References

 
Green algae classes